A bovid hybrid is the hybrid offspring of members of two different species of the bovid family. There are 143 extant species of bovid, and the widespread domestication of several species has led to an interest in hybridisation for the purpose of encouraging traits useful to humans, and to preserve declining populations. Bovid hybrids may occur naturally through undirected interbreeding, traditional pastoral practices, or may be the result of modern interventions, sometimes bringing together species from different parts of the world.

Bos hybrids

Hybrids between bison and domestic cattle 

The American bison and European bison (wisent) have been hybridized with domestic cattle.

European bison 
The wisent, or European bison, was originally crossed with cattle in an attempt to reinvigorate the declining wisent population. First generation hybrid males are sterile, but females may be crossed back to either a wisent or domestic bull to produce fertile males. Modern wisent herds keep hybrids well isolated from pure wisent. However, since the modern purebred wisent descend from fewer than two dozen individuals, a significant genetic bottleneck has resulted for the purebred wisent. These were first bred in Poland in 1847 as hardy, disease resistant alternatives to domestic cattle. Breeding was discontinued in the 1980s. The few remaining  can be found at Bialowieski National Park.

American bison 

American bison bulls (American "buffalo") have been crossed with domestic cattle to produce beefalo or cattalo. These are variable in type and colour, depending on the breed of cattle used e.g. Herefords and Charolais (beef cattle), Holsteins (dairy) or Brahmans (humped cattle). Generally, they are horned with heavy set forequarters, sloping backs and lighter hindquarters. Beefalo have been back-crossed to bison and to domestic cattle; some of these resemble pied bison with smooth coats and a maned hump. 

The aim is to produce high protein, low fat and low cholesterol beef on animals which have "less hump and more rump". Although bison bull-domestic cow crossings are more usual, domestic bull-bison cow crossings have a lower infant mortality rate (cow immune systems can reject hybrid calves). Modern beefalo include fertile bulls, making the beefalo a variety of "improved cattle" with a dash of bison. Bull and cow cattalos are reported in Wonders of Animal Life, edited by J. A. Hammerton (1930).

Hybrids between zebu and other Bos species 
The zebu, now called Bos taurus indicus, is the common domestic cow in much of Asia. They have been interbred with other domestic cattle over thousands of years. Some zebu breeds are derived from hybrids between zebu and yak, gaur and banteng. Zebu breeds have been widely crossed with European cattle. In Brazil, the Chanchim breed is 5/8 Charolais and 3/8 Zebu and combines the Charolais' meat quality and yield with the zebu's heat-resistance.

In The Variation of Animals and Plants Under Domestication, Charles Darwin wrote:

Hybrids between domestic cattle and yaks 

In India, Nepal, Tibet, and Mongolia, cattle are crossbred with yaks. This gives rise to the infertile male , often used as oxen, as well as fertile females which are bred into cattle breeds and can serve as milk cows. The "Dwarf Lulu" breed of cattle was tested for DNA markers and found to be a mixture of both types of cattle with yak genetics.

Hybrids between bison and yaks 
Yaks can also cross with bison; the hybrid offspring are occasionally kept by farmers in northern Alberta where the snowy, cold winters necessitate a cold-hardy animal. American bison has been bred with the domestic Tibetan yak to create the yakalo. Domestic yak bulls mated with bison cows produced fully fecund progeny, both sexes. Male yak bred to beefalo produced fertile females and sterile males. The appearance of the yak × bison hybrid is strongly reminiscent morphologically to Bison latifrons.

Hybrids between bison

Hybrids between species of bison 

In an attempt to revive the Caucasian wisent, the American bisons and the European bisons were crossbred. Some noted that these hybrids should be classified as a new subspecies Bison bonasus montanus.

Hybrids between subspecies of American bison 
A herd of hybrid plains bison × wood bison lived wild in the Yukon, Canada. The wood bison is a distinct subspecies that almost became extinct in the 20th century. In an attempt to save the plains bison subspecies, between 1925 and 1928, thousands of plains bison were released into Wood Buffalo Park, a preserve for the wood bison subspecies. They readily interbred and produced a 12,000 strong herd by 1934. The wood bison was nearly hybridized into extinction.

A small genetically pure herd was recovered from an isolated area in 1959 and is now being kept isolated from introduced plains bison. Recent genetic testing seems to indicate that these wood bison are themselves hybridized with the plains subspecies, though their genetic makeup remains predominantly that of the wood buffalo.

Intergeneric hybrids 
Intergeneric hybrids are hybrids whose parents each belong to a different genus, such as buffalo in the genus Bubalus and cattle in the genus Bos.

Water buffalo-domestic cattle hybrids 
Water buffalo and domestic cattle are not known to be able to hybridize. In laboratory experiments, the embryos fail around the 8-cell stage.

There were suggestions of crossing the beefalo (an American bison-domestic cattle hybrid) to Cape buffalo, although this idea essentially ended when the Cape buffalo was found to have 52 chromosomes (instead of 60 as in cattle and bison), meaning that the hybrid's success would be unlikely.

Genetic testing for hybrids

Genetic testing of public herds 
Mitochondrial DNA testing of the Custer State Park herd have shown that 6% of the animals have bovine DNA traits and Dr. Derr from Texas A&M University, who led a study into bison genetics, conceded that the ‘hybrid’ animals tested were at least 15-20 generations from the original base stock and those animals contained only 0.003% bovine DNA. This herd was started in 1901 with a relatively small number of animals (30). At the time, all these animals were believed to be pure through analysis of the physical phenotype but at least one animal with some bovine DNA must have been included in the original herd. Since the herd was formed, no new animals have been introduced and in this closed genetic pool, bovine DNA influences have not exceeded 6%, despite numerous generations of animals having passed. It is not yet known why this bovine DNA has not influenced a greater proportion of the herd nor a higher percentage of bovine DNA having survived, but one theory is that pure-bred animals with bovine influence do not grow to be as competitive as full-blood animals and are less likely to become dominant herd bulls. Therefore, the hybrid animals bulls are less likely to reproduce in the wild than pure animals, limiting the spread of bovine DNA within the herd.

Not all public herds in the US and Canada have been tested for bovine DNA, but the Elk Island Plains Bison Herd in Canada has been tested as pure. Other public herds that are believed to be pure include the Yellowstone Park Bison Herd, the Henry Mountains Bison Herd and the Wind Cave Bison Herd.

Genetic testing of private herds 
Since DNA testing for purity has become available, there is a growing movement among bison ranchers to test their herds and cull animals that test positive for bovine DNA. The largest private herd in the world, with over 50,000 animals, is currently undergoing such a program. As similar programs gather momentum among smaller private herds, the level of hybridization among private herds will likely reduce to a very small level as there is no commercial gain to be had by hybridization and both the Canadian and American Bison Associations share the goal of preserving pure bison herds.

However, at present, most private herds have yet to be tested for bovine DNA and the majority of plains bison in North America can be found in these private herds. As these herds have been built from the same original base stock as the public herds, is possible that up to 6% of some herds may contain bovine DNA. Consequently, out of approximately 500,000 bison in North America, it is possible that up to 30,000 may have some bovine DNA. Due to many base herds having started pure with feed stock from pure public herds such as Elk Island Park, this may be a high estimate and the true number of bison containing bovine DNA is likely to be significantly lower.

References

Works cited 

 
 
 

Bovid hybrids
Bovidae
Mammal conservation